Social Security may refer to:
Social security, the general notion of a society ensuring basic needs are met
Social Security System (Philippines)
South African Social Security Agency, an agency of the South African government
Social Security (United States), the United States retirement and disability program
Social Security Organization, a social insurer organization in Iran
Social Security (play), a play by Andrew Bergman

See also
Department of Social Security (disambiguation)
National pension (disambiguation)